The Bearded Collie, or Beardie, is a herding breed of dog once used primarily by Scottish shepherds, but now mostly a popular family companion.

History

The legend of the Bearded Collie's origin is that the ancestors of what is today the Polish Lowland Sheepdog were abandoned on the shores of Scotland, and these dogs then bred with native herding dogs. A variant on this story is that Kazimierz Grabski, a Polish merchant, reportedly traded a shipment of grain for sheep in Scotland in 1514 and brought six Polish Lowland Sheepdogs to move them. A Scottish shepherd was so impressed with the herding ability of the dogs that he traded several sheep for several dogs. The Polish sheepdogs were bred with local Scottish dogs to produce the Bearded Collie.

It is generally agreed that Mrs. G. Olive Willison founded the modern Bearded Collie in 1944 with her brown bitch, Jeannie of Bothkennar. Jeannie was supposedly a Shetland Sheepdog, but Mrs. Willison received a Bearded Collie by accident. She was so fascinated by the dog that she wanted to begin breeding, so she began searching for a dog for Jeannie. While walking along the beach, Mrs. Willison met a man who was emigrating from Scotland; she became the owner of his grey dog, David, who became Bailie of Bothkennar.

Bailie and Jeannie of Bothkennar are the founders of the modern breed; there are only a few other registrable blood lines, preserved in large part by the perseverance of Mr. Nicolas Broadbridge (Sallen) and Mrs. Betty Foster (Bredon). These are based on Turnbull's Blue—a Bearded Collie from pure working stock, registered in ISDS when ISDS still registered non-Border Collies. He sired three litters of registerable Bearded Collies.

The breed became popular during the last half of the 20th century—propelled, in part, by Potterdale Classic at Moonhill, a Bearded Collie who won Best in Show at Crufts in 1989. The Bearded Collie Club celebrated its Golden Jubilee in 2005. The bearded collie is also very good natured and is good as a family pet and a working dog and a show dog.

As pets

The Bearded Collie ranks 117 out of 175 breeds in popularity in the United States, according to the American Kennel Club's yearly breed ranking. A Bearded Collie is best obtained from a reputable breeder or a dog rescue. There are Beardie rescue associations, such as Beardie Collie Rescue and "Rescue Me". These organisations attempt to place unwanted puppies and dogs into appropriate, loving homes. Most Bearded Collie breeders take great care in breeding, raising and placing their puppies. Due to this, Bearded Collies are considered an "unspoiled" breed.

Bearded Collies make excellent pets for those willing to accommodate their high energy level - they are very enthusiastic and have a bouncy nature. They also require regular grooming; weekly brushing is mandatory for keeping their long hair mat-free. Some Bearded Collie owners opt to keep their pets in a "puppy cut" haircut, which reduces (but does not eliminate) the need for brushing. Bearded Collies are an energetic breed, originally intended to work in the Scottish Highlands herding sheep; they also excel at treibball, dog agility and Obedience trials. A loyal and family-friendly dog, the Beardie can add years of pet-ownership enjoyment to the home. They have keen problem-solving abilities, and are entertaining to watch.

In training, beardies can be independent, they will go from A to B but maybe not via the expected route. One of the most common problems for new Beardie owners is the breed's intelligence makes them prone to get quickly fed up if training gets too repetitive.

Working life

The Bearded Collie is used to herd both sheep and cattle. It is essentially a working dog—bred to be hardy and reliable, able to stand up to the harshest conditions and the toughest sheep. The working Bearded Collie has become less common in the last few decades and risked dying out; however, thanks to the efforts of a few shepherds like Tom Muirhead and Peter Wood, 
the "working Beardie" has survived and is becoming more popular. It has been exported to Australia and the United States, and finds favour among those looking for an independent and intelligent sheepdog. The Working Bearded Collie Society's mission is to preserve the working abilities of non-registered working dogs from "bearded" ancestors. The website Shepherds with beardies has much valuable information on the small population of working Beardies.

The KC-registered Bearded Collie has fallen into disfavour with the shepherds of Wales, Scotland and elsewhere because of the show-breeding community's lack of interest in producing "hardy and reliable" animals; show-bred lines tend to develop excessive coats, in particular. However, in some countries (notably Sweden and the United States) herding programmes have been developed for the breed. The breed organisations in those countries actively encourage breeders to emphasise qualities other than appearance.

The Bearded Collie may have earned its nickname "bouncing Beardie" because the dogs would work in thick underbrush on hillsides; they would bounce to catch sight of the sheep. Beardies also have a characteristic way of facing a stubborn ewe, barking and bouncing on the forelegs. Whatever the reason, a typical Bearded Collie is an enthusiastic herding dog which requires structure and care; it moves stock with body, bark and bounce as required. Very few Beardies show "eye" when working; most are upright.

Herding instincts and tractability can be assessed in noncompetitive herding tests. Beardies exhibiting basic herding instincts can be trained to compete in herding trials.

Health

The size of an average litter is seven pups.

Mortality
The median longevity (the age at which half of the population has died and half is still alive) of Bearded Collies from recent UK and USA/Canada surveys (the weighted average of all surveys) is 12.8 years; Beardies  in the UK surveys lived longer (median ~13.4 years) than their USA/Canada counterparts (median 12.0 years). Most purebred breeds have median longevities between 10 and 13 years and most breeds similar in size to Bearded Collies have median longevities between 11 and 13 years, so the lifespan of Bearded Collies appears to be on the high end compared with other breeds (at least in the UK). Individual dogs may die much earlier or later than the median. In a 1996 USA/Canada survey, 32% of Beardies died (including accidental deaths) before the age of nine; however, 12% lived longer than 14 years. The eldest of the 278 deceased dogs in the 2004 UK Kennel Club survey died at 19.5 years; the age at death of the oldest dog in the USA/Canada survey was not reported.

Leading causes of death among Beardies in the UK are old age (26%), cancer (19%), cerebrovascular disease (9%), and chronic kidney failure (8%). Leading causes of death among Beardies in the US and Canada are old age (18%), cancer (17%), kidney failure (8%), cerebrovascular disease (4%) and hypoadrenocorticism (4%).

Morbidity
Bearded Collie owners in the UK reported that the most common health issues among living dogs were musculoskeletal—mostly arthritis and cruciate ligament rupture (CLR)—gastrointestinal (primarily colitis and diarrhea) and urologic diseases. Beardie owners in the US and Canada reported that the most common health problems were hypothyroidism, cancer, hypoadrenocorticism (also known as Addison's disease), arthritis and skin problems. Morbidity in the two studies is not easily compared, however; the UK report grouped diseases, while the USA/Canada report ranked more specific conditions.

Further existing breed dispositions of the Bearded Collie include: Dermatological conditions, such as pemphigus foliaceous and black skin disease, follicular dysplasia, musculoskeletal conditions such as congenital elbow luxation, ocular conditions, such as corneal dystrophy, cataract and generalized progressive retinal atrophy (GPRA).

Hypoadrenocorticism

Hypoadrenocorticism (also known as Addison's disease) is an inherited disease in Bearded Collies, although the mechanism of inheritance is not known. It occurs when the adrenal cortex produces insufficient glucocorticoid and/or mineralocorticoid hormones. It affects approximately 2–3.4% of Bearded Collies in the USA/Canada, and causes the death of at least 1% of Bearded Collies in the UK. These are much higher percentages than for the general dog population (0.1%), and hypoadrenocorticism causes a disproportionate number of deaths among young dogs. Early symptoms are vague and easily mistaken for other conditions. Symptoms include unexplained lethargy, frequent gastric disturbances, or an inability to tolerate stress. Untreated, hypoadrenocorticism can cause fatal sodium/potassium imbalances; with lifelong medication, most dogs can live a relatively normal life.

In popular culture
The role of Nana in the original production of the James Barrie play Peter Pan was performed by a Bearded Collie.
A Bearded Collie named Coal featured in the 2006 film The Shaggy Dog starring Tim Allen. This film involves Dave who turns into one after getting bitten by a sacred dog.
Ralphie, a Bearded Collie, appears in the 2009 film Hotel for Dogs.

See also
 Dogs portal
 List of dog breeds

References

External links

FCI breeds
Herding dogs
Dog breeds originating in Scotland